José Arruza was a Spanish footballer who played as a midfielder for Arenas de Getxo. The dates of his birth and death are unknown.

Biography
Born in Getxo, he began his career at his hometown club Arenas de Getxo, and he was a member of the team that won the 1919 Copa del Rey Final after beating FC Barcelona 5–2. Like many other Arenas de Getxo players of that time, Arruza played a few games for the Biscay team, participating in both the 1922–23 and the 1923–24 Prince of Asturias Cups, an official inter-regional competition organized by the RFEF. Both campaigns ended in narrow defeats to Asturias (3–4) and Catalonia (0–1). In the quarter-finals of the 1922–23 edition against Asturias, Arruza is listed in some sources as one of the goalscorers in a 1–1 draw that forced the replay in which they lost.

Honours
Arenas Club
North Championship: 1918–19, 1921–22
Copa del Rey: 1919

References

Year of birth missing
Spanish footballers
Association football midfielders
Year of death missing
Footballers from Getxo
Arenas Club de Getxo footballers
20th-century Spanish people